KCBS may refer to:

 KCBS-TV, a television station (PSIP 2.1/RF31) licensed to Los Angeles, California, United States
 KCBS-FM, a radio station (93.1 FM) licensed to Los Angeles, California, United States
 KCBS (AM), a radio station (740 AM) licensed to San Francisco, California, United States
 KFRC-FM, a radio station (106.9) also licensed to San Francisco which simulcasts KCBS (AM) and is branded as such
 Kansas City Barbeque Society
 Korean Central Broadcasting Station